Kodivaka is a village located about 5km from the town of Vakadu in Tirupati district, Andhra Pradesh, India. It is predominantly an agriculture village with paddy fields and cattle.

Villages in Tirupati district